The following is a partial list of apps with Google Cast support, and the platforms on which each can run. The first Google Cast receiver released was Google's Chromecast in July 2013; a digital media player in the form of an HDMI dongle, the device streams media wirelessly via Wi-Fi after a selection is made through a supported mobile or web app, such as those listed below. Unofficial Google Cast receivers followed, before Google released a second official receiver, the Nexus Player, in November 2014.

For information on Chromecast's app history and software development kit, see Chromecast software development kit and compatible apps.

* = PC-compatible (computers running Windows, macOS, Linux, or ChromeOS) web apps cited here require the Chrome browser, with the Google Cast extension installed, and have support for casting built into the website itself, without the need for "tab casting."

Table of Google Cast compatible apps
{|class="wikitable sortable" style="text-align: center; line-height:1.25"
|-
!Name
!PC*
!Android
!iOS
!Vendor
!Type
|-

!  | 5by
| 
| 
| 
| StumbleUpon
| Video
|-

!  | AllCast
| 
| 
| 
| ClockworkMod
| rowspan="2" | Multimedia
|-

!  | AllConnect
| 
| 
| 
| Tuxera
|-

!  class="table-rh" | Amazon Prime Video
| 
| 
| 
| Amazon.com, Inc.
| Video
|-

!  |AOL On
| 
| 
| 
| AOL/Verizon Media
| Video
|-

!  | ARD
| 
| 
| 
| ARD
| Multimedia
|-

!  |BBC America
| 
| 
| 
| BBC America
| Video
|-

!  |BBC iPlayer (UK only)
| 
| 
| 
| rowspan="2" | BBC
| Multimedia
|-

!  |BBC Sport (UK only)
| 
| 
| 
| rowspan="2" | Video
|-

!  class="table-rh" |Boomerang
| 
| 
| 
|Warner Bros.
|-

!  |Big Web Quiz for Chromecast
| 
| 
| 
| Google
| Game
|-

!  |blinkbox Movies (UK only)
| 
| 
| 
| rowspan="2" | Tesco
| Video
|-

!  |blinkbox Music (UK only)
| 
| 
| 
| Audio
|-

!  |BritBox UK (UK only)
| 
| 
| 
| BritBox SVOD Ltd
| rowspan="8" | Video
|-

!  |BT Sport (UK only)
| 
| 
| 
| BT Group
|-

!  | BTN2Go
| 
| 
| 
| Big Ten Conference
|-

!  | CanalPlay (France only)
| 
| 
| 
| Canal+
|-

!  class="table-rh" |Cartoon Network
| 
| 
| 
| Warner Bros.
|-

!  | CBC
| 
| 
| 
| Canadian Broadcasting Corporation
|-

!  | CBS
| 
| 
| 
| ViacomCBS
|-

!  | CBS Sports
| 
| 
| 
| CBS Interactive
|-

!  | Checkers For Chromecast
| 
| 
| 
| David Phan
| Game
|-

!  | CinemaNow
| 
| 
| 
| CinemaNow
| rowspan="3" | Video
|-

!  | Cmore
| 
| 
| 
| Cmore
|-

!  | Comedy Central
| 
| 
| 
| ViacomCBS Domestic Media Networks
|-

!  |Connect Four Quads
| 
| 
| 
| Hasbro
| Game
|-

!  | Crackle
| 
| 
| 
| Crackle
| rowspan="5" | Video
|-

!  | Crunchyroll
| 
| 
| 
| Crunchyroll
|-

!  | CuriosityStream
| 
| 
| 
| CuriosityStream
|-

!  | DailyBurn
| 
| 
| 
| IAC/InterActiveCorp
|-

!  | Dailymotion
| 
| 
| 
| Vivendi
|-

!  |Deezer (available in select regions)
| 
| 
| 
| Deezer
| Audio
|-

!  | Discovery Go
| 
| 
| 
| Discovery, Inc.
| rowspan="4" | Video
|-

!  | Disney+
| 
| 
| 
| The Walt Disney Company
|-

!  | DramaFever
| 
| 
| 
| Warner Bros.
|-

!  | DRTV
| 
| 
| 
| Danish Broadcasting Corporation
|-

!  | DS Audio (requires Synology NAS device)
| 
| 
| 
| rowspan="2" | Synology Inc.
| Audio
|-

!  | DS Video (requires Synology NAS device)
| 
| 
| 
| rowspan="8" | Video
|-

!  |Encore Play
| 
| 
| 
| Starz Inc./Lionsgate
|-

!  | Epix Go
| 
| 
| 
| Metro-Goldwyn-Mayer
|-

!  | ErosNow
| 
| 
| 
| Eros International
|-

!  | Eurosport Player
| 
| 
| 
| Discovery Networks Northern Europe
|-

!  | Flixster (US only)
| 
| 
| 
| Fandango Media, LLC.
|-

!  | FOX NOW
| 
| 
| 
| rowspan="2" | Fox Broadcasting Company
|-

!  | Fox Sports Go
| 
| 
| 
|-

!  | France.tv
| 
| 
| 
| France Télévisions
| Multimedia
|-

!  | Fullscreen
|
|
|
| Fullscreen
| rowspan="3" |Video
|-

!  | FXNOW
| 
| 
| 
| FX Network LLC
|-

!  |Gaiam TV
| 
| 
| 
| Gaiam
|-

!  class="table-rh" | Google Photos
| 
| 
| 
| rowspan="5" | Google
| Photo
|-

!  class="table-rh" | Google Podcasts
| 
| 
| 
| Audio
|-

!  class="table-rh" | Google Santa Tracker
| 
| 
| 
| Multimedia
|-

!  class="table-rh" | Google Slides 
| 
| 
| 
| Presentation
|-

!  class="table-rh" | Google TV
| 
| 
| 
| Video
|-

!  class="table-rh" | HBO Max
| 
| 
| 
| rowspan="2" | Home Box Office Inc.
| rowspan="5" | Video
|-

!  | HBO Nordic
| 
| 
| 
|-

!  | HGTV Watch 
| 
| 
| 
| Discovery, Inc.
|-

!  | Hoopla
| 
| 
| 
| Midwest Tape LLC
|-

!  | Hulu Plus
| 
| 
| 
| Hulu
|-

!  | iHeartRadio
| 
| 
| 
| iHeartMedia
| Audio
|-

!  |Just Dance Now
| 
| 
| 
| Ubisoft
| Game
|-

!  | MLB.tv
| 
| 
| 
| Major League Baseball
| rowspan="2" | Video
|-

!  | MLS Live
| 
| 
| 
| Major League Soccer
|-

!  |Monopoly Dash
| 
| 
| 
| Hasbro
| Game
|-
!  | MusicSync
| 
| 
| 
|
|Audio
|-

!  class="table-rh" |Napster (UK only)
| 
| 
| 
|Napster
| Audio
|-

!  | NBA Game Time (non-USA)
| 
| 
| 
| National Basketball Association
| rowspan="8" | Video
|-

!  | Nebula
| 
| 
| 
| Standard Broadcast LLC
|-

!  | Netflix
| 
| 
| 
| Netflix, Inc.
|-

!  | NFL Game Pass (non-USA)
| 
| 
| 
| National Football League
|-

!  | NFL Now
| 
| 
| 
| NFL Enterprises LLC
|-

!  | NFL Sunday Ticket
| 
| 
| 
| DirecTV, LLC
|-

!  | Nick
| 
| 
| 
| ViacomCBS Domestic Media Networks
|-

!  |Now TV (UK only)
| 
| 
| 
| Sky UK
|-

!  | NPO (Dutch)
| 
| 
| 
| Nederlandse Publieke Omroep
| Multimedia
|-

!  | NPR One
| 
| 
| 
| NPR
| Audio
|-

!  | NRK TV
| 
| 
| 
| NRK
| rowspan="2" | Video
|-

!  | Pac-12 Now
| 
| 
| 
| Pac-12 Networks
|-

!  | Pandora
| 
| 
| 
| Pandora Media, Inc.
| Audio
|-

!  | PBS Video
| 
| 
| 
| rowspan="2" | Public Broadcasting Service
| rowspan="2" | Video
|-

!  | PBS Kids
| 
| 
| 
|-

!  | PlayOn
| 
| 
| 
| MediaMall Technologies, Inc.
| rowspan="2" | Multimedia
|-

!  | Plex
| 
| 
| 
| Plex
|-

!  |Pluto.TV
| 
| 
| 
| Pluto.TV
| rowspan="4" | Video
|-

!  | Popcorn Time
| 
| 
| 
| Pochoclín
|-

!  | PornHub
| 
| 
| 
| PornHub
|-

!  | PostTV (aka "The Washington Post" app)
| 
| 
| 
| The Washington Post Company
|-

!  |radioPup
| 
| 
| 
| Townsquare Media
| Audio
|-

! | RaiPlay
| 
| 
| 
| RAI
| Video
|-

! | Rdio
| 
| 
| 
| Rdio
| Audio
|-

! | RealPlayer Cloud
| 
| 
| 
| RealNetworks
| rowspan="5" | Video
|-

!  | Red Bull TV
| 
| 
| 
| Red Bull GmbH
|-

!  | Redbox Instant (service shutdown on July 10, 2014)
| 
| 
| 
| Redbox & Verizon
|-

!  | Revision3
| 
| 
| 
| Revision3
|-

!  | Rev3Games
| 
| 
| 
| Revision3
|-

!  | Rhapsody
| 
| 
| 
| Rhapsody
| Audio
|-

!  class="table-rh" | RTHK Screen
| 
| 
| 
|Radio Television Hong Kong
| rowspan="2" | Video
|-

!  class="table-rh" | RTVE.es - A la carta
| 
| 
| 
|RTVE
|-

!  |Scrabble Blitz
| 
| 
| 
| Hasbro
| Game
|-

!  | Sesame Street Go
| 
| 
| 
| Sesame Workshop
| rowspan="3" | Video
|-

!  |Showtime
| 
| 
| 
| rowspan="2" | Showtime Networks
|-

!  |Showtime Anytime
| 
| 
| 
|-

!  |Simon Swipe
| 
| 
| 
| Hasbro
| Game
|-

!  | SlingPlayer (requires Slingbox device)
| 
| 
| 
| Sling Media
| rowspan="2" | Video
|-

!  | Sling TV
| 
| 
| 
| Sling TV, LLC
|-

!  | SomaFM
| 
| 
| 
| SomaFM
| rowspan="3" | Audio
|-

!  | Songza
| 
| 
| 
| Songza
|-

!  | SoundCloud
| 
| 
| 
| SoundCloud Ltd.
|-

!  | Sportsnet
| 
| 
| 
| Rogers Digital Media
| Video
|-

!  | Spotify
| 
| 
| 
| Spotify Ltd.
| Audio
|-

!  class="table-rh" | Stadia
| 
| 
| 
| 
| Video
|-

!  |Starz Play
| 
| 
| 
| Starz Inc./Lionsgate
| rowspan="3" | Video
|-

!  | SVT Play
| 
| 
| 
| Sveriges Television
|-

!  | TED
| 
| 
| 
| TED Conferences
|-

!  class="table-rh" |Tidal
| 
| 
| 
| Tidal
| Audio
|-

!  |TrueConf  
| 
| 
| 
| TrueConf
| Multimedia
|-

!  |TuneIn Radio Play
| 
| 
| 
| TuneIn Radio
| Audio
|-

!  | TV Cast
| 
| 
| 
| 2kit consulting
| rowspan="11" | Video
|-

!  | TV4 Play
| 
| 
| 
| TV4 Group
|-

!  |Twitch
| 
| 
| 
| Twitch
|-

!  |UFC
| 
| 
| 
| Ultimate Fighting Championship
|-

!  class="table-rh" |USA NOW
| 
| 
| 
|NBCUniversal Media, LLC
|-

!  | Vevo
| 
| 
| 
| VEVO, LLC
|-

!  | Viaplay
| 
| 
| 
| Viasat
|-

!  | VidZone
| 
| 
| 
| VidZone Digital Media
|-

!  | Viki
| 
| 
| 
| Viki Inc
|-

!  | Vimeo
| 
| 
| 
| IAC
|-

!  | VLC media player
| 
| 
| 
|VideoLAN
|-

!  | VOA
| 
| 
| 
| Voice of America
| Audio
|-

!  |VRT NU
| 
| 
| 
| VRT NV
| rowspan="9" | Video
|-

!  | VUDU
| 
| 
| 
| VUDU
|-

!  | WatchABC
| 
| 
| 
| American Broadcasting Company
|-

!  | WatchDisneyChannel
| 
| 
| 
| rowspan="3" | Disney Channels Worldwide
|-

!  | WatchDisneyJunior
| 
| 
| 
|-

!  | WatchDisneyXD
| 
| 
| 
|-

!  | WatchESPN
| 
| 
| 
| ESPN Inc.
|-

!  | Watch TBS
| 
| 
| 
| rowspan="2" | WarnerMedia
|-

!  | Watch TNT
| 
| 
| 
|-

!  |Wheel of Fortune
| 
| 
| 
| Sony Pictures Television
| Game
|-

!  |Wuaki.tv
| 
| 
| 
| Rakuten
| rowspan="3" | Video
|-

!  | Yle Areena
| 
| 
| 
| Yle
|-

!  | YouTube
| 
| 
| 
| rowspan="3" | Google
|-

!  class="table-rh" | YouTube Music
| 
| 
| 
|Audio
|-

!  class="table-rh" | YouTube TV
| 
| 
| 
| rowspan="3" |Video
|-

!  |YuppTV Play
| 
| 
| 
| YuppTV
|-

!  | Zattoo
| 
| 
| 
| Zattoo
|-

!  | ZDF
| 
| 
| 
| ZDF Mediathek
| Multimedia

|-
!  | Ziggo GO
| 
| 
| 
| Ziggo
| Video
|-

|}

References

Apps with Google Cast support
Streaming media systems
Google software